The DragonBox Pyra is an upcoming Linux-based handheld computer equipped with a keyboard and gaming controls. The project entered prototyping stage in 2015. Pre-orders began on 1 May 2016, with a final release date still undefined. In August 2020 the first production model had been shipped, but only to developers, as the software wasn't ready.

History 

The Dragonbox Pyra is the spiritual successor of the OpenPandora device, and shares some of the original Pandora team members. The Pyra is designed and developed in close connection with the OpenPandora community, taking their feedback and experience with the Pandora into account. The OpenPandora GmbH, residing in Germany, organizes design, prototyping and the production in Europe (Greece and Germany).

The Pyra was presented officially at the FOSDEM 2014 in Brussels. In 2015 several working developer prototypes of the Pyra have been produced and were given to software developers for evaluation and software creation. Development and fine tuning of the final specifications is still ongoing. Preorder of six Pyra variants (4 GB RAM and 3/4G mobile options) became possible on 1 May 2016.

Architecture 

Like the predecessor OpenPandora, the Pyra includes features from several architectures making it a cross between a handheld game console, a subnotebook, a PDA, and a smartphone.

The Pyra design aims for modularity and openness in software and hardware alike. For instance the PCB is separated in three parts: CPU board (CPU, RAM and storage), mainboard (ports, Wi-Fi and Bluetooth) and the display board. The replaceable CPU board allows future upgrades of CPU and RAM. The Pyra is assembled with screws (not glued) and is therefore repair and modification friendly.

It was announced that the hardware schematics will be available (final license undecided), which make the Pyra a kind of Open source hardware. For compliance with the Free Software Foundation's "Respects Your Freedom" certificate the closed source SGX GPU driver was identified as the only remaining software roadblock ("would be good to have free drivers, but we can't achieve this for the GPU" but the device may or may not run without a 3D driver, possibly free 2D driver is available or either could be made). The certification is not only about bundled software, using proprietary software, or recommending it, such as non-free (including emulated) games, but also about naming, e.g. Linux vs. GNU/Linux. In November 2016 a pre-release version of the Pyra schematics was made available under a CC BY-NC-SA license.

Software 
The operating system will be based on the common open source Linux distribution Debian which allows the use of already available desktop open-source applications from the Debian ARM repository, for instance Firefox, Thunderbird, LibreOffice, GIMP, etc. The around 1,500 applications, created for the mostly open source OpenPandora software ecosystem, are expected to be available for the Pyra in short time by source ports.

Technical specifications 
The various model specifications are summarized as follows:

Reception 
In 2017, Salon noted the Pyra in an article about the comeback of the netbook.

Gallery

See also 

 Comparison of handheld game consoles
 Comparison of open-source mobile phones
 Linux for gaming
 Pandora (console)
 GCW Zero
 Caanoo
 Dingoo
 Steam Deck

External links 

 
 Pyra Info Page on PandoraLive
 Discussion forum

References 

ARM-based video game consoles
Embedded Linux
Handheld personal computers
Handheld game consoles
Linux-based devices
Personal digital assistants
Texas Instruments hardware
Linux-based video game consoles
Crowdfunded video game consoles